The Subject may refer to:
 The Subject (2018 film), a Canadian animated short film
 The Subject (2020 film), an American drama film

See also
 Subject (disambiguation)